Jeff Moleski (born February 3, 1982 in Prince George, British Columbia) is a Canadian professional lacrosse player who plays for the Calgary Roughnecks in the National Lacrosse League. The Roughnecks drafted Moleski 34th overall in the 3rd round in the 2003 NLL entry draft. Jeffrey since played for Team Canada in the Czech Republic, contributing to bring home the gold. Prior to returning to the Roughnecks in 2015, he played for the Vancouver Stealth and formerly the Washington Stealth.

During the 2009 NLL season, he was named a reserve to the All-Star game.

Statistics

NLL
Reference:

References

1982 births
Canadian lacrosse players
Calgary Roughnecks players
Living people
National Lacrosse League All-Stars
Sportspeople from Prince George, British Columbia
Sportspeople from British Columbia